The Volvo B7RLE is a low-entry single-deck bus chassis manufactured by Volvo. It was superseded by the Volvo B8RLE in 2013.

Specifications
The Volvo B7RLE is similar to its predecessor, the B10BLE. In essence the B7RLE is the front section of the B7L chassis mated with the rear section of the B7R chassis. Originally, the B7RLE featured the D7C 6-cylinder, 7.3-litre diesel engine with a turbocharger and intercooler, producing 250 or 275 bhp and meeting the Euro III incentive emission standard. This was replaced by the 7.1-litre Volvo D7E engine producing 290 bhp, to Euro III/Euro IV/Euro V incentive emission standards. Unlike the B7L, the B7RLE's engine is mounted at the center of the rear overhang as opposed to the nearside, resolving the issue of engine intrusion into the saloon. The Volvo B7RLE is also equipped with disc brakes and ABS.

Operators
The Volvo B7RLE was launched in mainland Europe and Australia in 2001, and then in the United Kingdom in 2003 to supplement the B7L, which was unsuccessful in both countries. The B7RLE appealed more to UK operators, with whom the B7L was unpopular and has sold well compared to its predecessor.

United Kingdom and Ireland
Major purchasers of the B7RLE included Arriva (134), Blazefield Group (88), Bus Éireann (73), East Yorkshire Motor Services (27), FirstGroup (820), Lothian Buses (90), National Express West Midlands (188), Ulsterbus (46), Wellglade Group (51) and Wilts & Dorset (78).

Initially the B7RLE was only available in the UK with Wright Eclipse Urban bodywork. From 2004 it was built as a low-floor single-decker coach, with a longer front overhang and Wright Eclipse Commuter body. From late 2006 the B7RLE in the UK was available with Plaxton Centro bodywork followed by Alexander Dennis Enviro300 and Optare Esteem bodywork in 2008.

Australia
In Australia, the B7RLE was purchased in large numbers by Transport for Brisbane (554), ComfortDelGro Australia (400), State Transit (123) and Transperth (767) with Bustech, Custom Bus and Volgren bodywork.

China Mainland
The B7RLE is one of the very few foreign bus chassis models in Mainland China, assembled by Shanghai Sunwin Bus, assigned Chinese assembly model numbers SWB6125, SWB6120V4LE, and SWB6120V6LE. Units operated in Shanghai are SWB6120V4LE, with fleet number prefix  S2F/S2G (Shanghai Public Transport) & S2B (Pudong Bus) (Euro III); S2D, with fleet number prefix S2D (written off) and SWB6120V6LE, with fleet number prefix S2M (Shanghai Public Transport)(Euro IV w/ adblue). One SWB6120V6LE unit was sent to Nanjing Public Transport as a gift, but never entered service due to a series of reasons. The B7RLE was seen very commonly on Shanghai streets. However, Shanghai Public Transport is planning to retire its entire B7RLE fleet together with the B9Ls and B7Ls by the end of 2022, making its transition to battery-powered electric and diesel hybrid buses.

The entire fleet of B7RLEs in China mainland are equipped with Volvo D7B260/D7E290EC01/D7E290EC06 Engines paired with ZF EcoMat 6HP554C transmission.

Hong Kong
In 2003, Huangbus (Lok Ma Chau - Huanggang shuttle bus service) purchased five B7RLEs with Jit Luen JL-08 bodies and D7E-290 7142cc engines. Kowloon Motor Bus ordered 70 B7RLEs with MCV Evolution bodies in 2009, which some of them had been converted to Training buses.

India
In India, B7RLEs were introduced into service in Bangalore in 2006 by the Bangalore Metropolitan Transport Corporation. The B7RLEs are also operated by Metropolitan Transport Corporation and Tamil Nadu State Transport Corporation in Chennai and Pondicherry, Kerala State Road Transport Corporation in Kochi and Thiruvananthapuram and in 2014 Kerala Urban Road Transport Corporation started using B7RLEs for their Town To Town services all over Kerala state.

They were later inducted into the fleets of Navi Mumbai Municipal Transport, and BEST for use in Navi Mumbai and Mumbai respectively. Custom made B7RLE chassis are assembled at Volvo's factory outside Bangalore. The dual-doored versions are operated by the WBTC in Kolkata. B7RLEs are also operated by Assam State Transport Corporation in Assam state.

Indonesia
Some Volvo B7RLEs also operate in Surabaya, Indonesia. It is the first wheelchair-accessible bus (WAB) in Indonesia fitted with a Euro IV engine.

Israel
Metropoline purchased Volvo B7RLEs with Merkavim Pioneer bodywork. Some bus companies own Volvo B7RLEs with USB sockets, WiFi and Real time  and it is the first country to use 2009 buses with a new ZF EcoLife transmission

Malaysia
In 2006, Rapid Bus ordered 120 Deftech bodied B7RLE buses for operation on RapidKL services. This is the first Rapid Bus fleet to feature wheelchair accessible ramp, and only bus fleet to feature wheelchair accessible ramp at both front and rear doors (later front doors ramp were removed after refurbishment). Later in 2014, MRT Malaysia Corp ordered 150 Gemilang Coachworks bodied B7RLE's for operation on MRT feeder bus.

New Zealand
Ritchies Coachlines operate 20 bodied by DesignLine. Mana Coach Services operate 22 Kiwi Bus Builders bodied examples with a third axle added.

Philippines
The Philippines has B7RLEs running in Cebu City, operated by Metro Rapid Transport System Inc., the owner of MyBus. Starting July 2016, RRCG Transport launches "P2P (Point-to-Point) Premium Bus Service" for Alabang Town Center to Greenbelt 1, serving 3 units for King Long XMQ6127G with Sunwin SWB6128 front and rear mask, built by the Philippine-based Autodelta Coach Builders, Inc. This model is also used by Cebu Pacific for transporting passengers from NAIA Terminal 3 to their aircraft. The bus company Joanna Jesh Transport and CEM Trans Services Inc also started to use the bus model for its FTI-Navotas and Alabang-Malanday route respectively starting in 2019.

Singapore
Singapore has B7RLEs running in Sentosa featuring Liannex bodies, either in a city bus configuration for its internal shuttles, or as open-top double-decker buses. An Euro IV demonstrator featuring Soon Chow bodywork was offered to SBS Transit (initially meant for a one-year trial) in December 2007, registered as SBS8030L, and is under Hougang Depot as a training bus currently.

Taiwan
In Taiwan, B7RLEs were first introduced on Chiayi Bus Rapid Transit (Chiayi BRT) in 2007. All B7RLEs in Taiwan that were manufactured between 2007 and 2012 featured Tang Eng Iron Works bodywork, whereas those manufactured after 2013 featured Daji bodywork.

References

External links

Product description at Volvo website
Volvo's first city buses in India operating.  2006-01-25 Volvo Buses. Retrieved 2009-06-23

B7RLE
Low-entry buses
Bus chassis